Charlotte Little is an American politician serving as a member of the New Mexico House of Representatives for the 68th district. She narrowly won election in the 2022 house election against Republican Robert Moss, who she beat by 35 votes following a recount. Little is a member of the San Felipe Pueblo.

References

Living people
Democratic Party members of the New Mexico House of Representatives
Women state legislators in New Mexico
21st-century Native American women
21st-century Native American politicians
Native American women in politics
Year of birth missing (living people)